Jessica Elizabeth Pauline Shynn (born 20 August 1982 in Perth, Western Australia) is an Australian netball player. She represented the national squad from 2002 to 2004, and was a member of the open squad in 2005 and 2006. Shynn played franchise netball in the Commonwealth Bank Trophy for her home team Perth Orioles from 1999 to 2006. In 2006 she came down with a knee injury and has an undecided future in the game. She has not yet played in the new Trans-Tasman league, the ANZ Championship. Shynn has nine test caps for Australia.

References
ABC Sport profile. Retrieved on 2008-12-16.
Perth Orioles history. Retrieved on 2008-12-16.

External links
Action photo from The Age

1982 births
Living people
Netball players at the 2006 Commonwealth Games
Commonwealth Games silver medallists for Australia
Commonwealth Games medallists in netball
Australia international netball players
Perth Orioles players
Netball players from Western Australia
Medallists at the 2006 Commonwealth Games